

See also
 Wikipedia: Wall of text